Enchanted (or The Enchanted Works of Stevie Nicks) is a three disc box set of material by American singer-songwriter and Fleetwood Mac vocalist Stevie Nicks, which encompasses her solo career from Bella Donna (1981) to Street Angel (1994).

The box set also contains rare B-sides, unreleased live recordings, demos, songs from soundtracks, a track from the album Buckingham Nicks (1973), outtakes from the Bella Donna and Rock a Little sessions, and a new piano recording of the Nicks-penned Fleetwood Mac song, "Rhiannon". Some previously released tracks are also in noticeably longer versions, or alternative remixes.

The set was released on April 28, 1998 and peaked at #85 on the Billboard 200 Albums chart. Enchanted was certified Gold by the RIAA on April 7, 1999 For Shipments of over 166,000 copies. Two singles were released, "Reconsider Me" (a deleted track from the album Rock a Little (1985)) and "Enchanted" which made its first appearance on the album The Wild Heart (1983).

It was mastered using HDCD technology and, although it is unmarked, playing the album in a CD player able to decode HDCD will give superior sound quality.

Track listing

Disc one

Disc two

Disc three

Personnel
 Stevie Nicks – lead vocals, keyboards, guitars, harmonica, piano, percussion
 Lindsey Buckingham – guitar, percussion, vocals
 Mick Fleetwood – drums, percussion 
 Tom Petty – guitar, vocals
 Mike Campbell – guitars, keyboards, bass
 Sandy Stewart – piano, vocals, synthesizer
 Kenny Loggins – vocals
 Bruce Hornsby – vocals
 Don Henley – vocals, drums
 Joe Walsh – guitar
 Jesse Valenzuela – guitar, mandolin 
 Waddy Wachtel – guitar
 Dean Parks – guitar
 Steve Lukather – guitar
 Danny Kortchmar – guitar
 Mike Landau – guitar
 Kenny G – saxophone
 Dave Koz – saxophone
 Benmont Tench – piano, synthesizer, organ
 David Foster – piano
 Bob Glaub – bass
 Donald "Duck" Dunn – bass
 Tony Levin – bass
 Gary "Hoppy" Hodges – drums, percussion
 Russ Kunkel – drums
 Stan Lynch – drums
 Sharon Celani – backing vocals
 Lori Perry-Nicks – backing vocals
 Carolyn Brooks – backing vocals
 Marilyn Martin – backing vocals
 David Crosby – backing vocals
 Roy Bittan – piano
 Steve Hall - box set mastering at Future Disc

Charts and certifications

Certifications

References

Stevie Nicks albums
Albums produced by Don Was
Albums produced by Thom Panunzio
Albums produced by Keith Olsen
Albums produced by Rick Nowels
Albums produced by Rupert Hine
Albums produced by Jimmy Iovine
Albums produced by Lindsey Buckingham
Albums produced by Chris Lord-Alge
1998 compilation albums